FRAME magazine (capitalized by its creators; the E in FRAME often appears mirror-reversed on the magazine's cover) is a magazine devoted to interior design, architecture, product design and  exhibition design based in Amsterdam, Netherlands. The magazine was first published in 1997 by Frame Publishers and have about 6 issues a year. Robert Thiemann is the founder and editor-in-chief of the magazine.

Frame magazine is one of the leading interior design publications. Since its launch in 1997, the magazine has remained faithful to its mission: putting interior architecture on the map as a creative profession that's equally important as design and architecture. The magazine is sold in 77 countries and is printed in English and Korean.

The magazine is published by the parent company Frame Publishers, which also produces various design related books and occasional monographs on the work of prominent companies and people in the design world.

References

External links
 Frame Magazine

1997 establishments in the Netherlands
Design magazines
Magazines established in 1997
Magazines published in Amsterdam